The Leader-Spirit is a community newspaper serving the communities of Dresden, Bothwell and Thamesville, Ontario. Its first issue was published on Dec. 31, 2008. The Leader-Spirit is a tabloid and is a paid paper that goes to about 2,000 subscribers. The Leader-Spirit is an amalgamation of the Dresden Leader and the Spirit of Bothwell.

History

The Leader was founded on Sept. 16, 1965 by Gord Clauws and Ted Misselbrook, and was originally known as the North Kent Leader. The Spirit of Bothwell was founded in April 1992 by Jim Kish. The Leader-Spirit's publisher is Dean Muharrem, and the reporter-photographer is April Colby.

See also
List of newspapers in Canada

External links
 The Leader-Spirit - Archived copy

Postmedia Network publications
Weekly newspapers published in Ontario
Mass media in Chatham-Kent
Newspapers established in 2008
2008 establishments in Ontario